Kellie Wilson (born 22 October 1966) is an Australian former gymnast. She competed in five events at the 1984 Summer Olympics.

References

External links
 

1966 births
Living people
Australian female artistic gymnasts
Olympic gymnasts of Australia
Gymnasts at the 1984 Summer Olympics
Place of birth missing (living people)
20th-century Australian women